"He Did That" is the first single released by American rapper Silkk the Shocker from his fourth album, My World, My Way. It is among his popular singles. It was produced by Donald XL Robertson and featured Mac and Master P. "He Did That" was successful, peaking at #14 on the Billboard Hot R&B/Hip-Hop Singles & Tracks and #3 on the Billboard Hot Rap Singles.

The music video takes place a mansion filled with Mercedes Benz featuring appearances by Master P.

Single track listing

CD
"He Did That" [Radio Edit]- 3:26
"He Did That" [Album Version]- 3:30
"He Did That" [Multimedia track]- 3:36
"He Did That" [Instrumental]- 3:20

Charts

2000 singles
Silkk the Shocker songs
2000 songs